Loïc Bruni (born 13 May 1994) is a professional downhill mountain biker. He is a student at Skema Business School.

Career
Going into the 2015 season Bruni was one of the favorites. For that season he came 2nd in the world rankings on the Union Cycliste Internationale (UCI) Downhill Mountain Bike circuit. In that season he qualified first three times, but did not win any of those World Cup races. At the end of the 2015 season Bruni won the UCI World Championships, which is a stand-alone event not part of the World Cup series. He set the fastest time on his run with two riders left to start: Troy Brosnan and Aaron Gwin. Both Brosnan and Gwin fell on their runs, leaving Bruni as the winner.

Career summary

References

External links

1994 births
Living people
UCI Mountain Bike World Champions (men)
French male cyclists
Downhill mountain bikers
Cyclists from Nice
French  mountain bikers